Cavusgnathus is an extinct genus of conodonts.

Glen K. Merrill stated in 1963 that "conodont workers have considered Idiognathoides to be a junior synonym of Polygnathodella but it now proves to be a junior synonym of Cavusgnathus. Polygnathodella and Cavusgnathus are shown to form a transitional series."

References

External links 
 
 

Ozarkodinida genera
Pennsylvanian conodonts
Gzhelian life
Kasimovian life
Fossil taxa described in 1933
Pennsylvanian first appearances
Pennsylvanian extinctions